Flaveria bidentis, the coastal plain yellowtops, is a South American plant species of Flaveria within the family Asteraceae. It is native to South America, and naturalized in many places (Mexico, Central America, the West Indies, the southeastern United States, Europe, Africa, Asia, etc.).

In the U.S. it was introduced into the states of Georgia, Alabama and Florida.

One plant can sometimes produce 100 or more flower heads in a tightly packed array. Each head contains 3-8 yellow disc flowers. Sometimes the head also contains a single yellow ray flower.

References 

bidentis
Flora of South America
Plants described in 1767